Leander Paes and Radek Štěpánek were the defending champions, but Štěpánek chose not to compete.  Paes played alongside Daniel Nestor, but lost in the second round to Robert Lindstedt and Vasek Pospisil.
Ivan Dodig and Marcelo Melo won the title, defeating David Marrero and Fernando Verdasco in the final, 7–6(7–2), 6–7(6–8), [10–2].

Seeds
All seeds receive a bye into the second round.

Draw

Finals

Top half

Bottom half

References
 Main Draw

Shanghai Rolex Masters - Doubles
2013 Shanghai Rolex Masters